"One More Night" is a single by British singer Sandie Shaw. After several years of hardship following her divorce from fashion designer Jeff Banks, Shaw released this ballad with CBS Records in 1977 without commercial success.

The song was originally recorded by singer-songwriter Stephen Bishop on his 1976 debut album Careless and subsequently recorded by Barbra Streisand on her 1978 album Songbird.

1977 singles
Sandie Shaw songs